Hawks Nest Golf Club is a championship rated 18-hole golf course with an Australian Course Rating of 72 in the Hunter Region of New South Wales, Australia.

External links

1963 establishments in Australia
Sports clubs established in 1963
Sports venues completed in 1963
Golf clubs and courses in New South Wales